The shorthead barb (Enteromius breviceps) is a species of ray-finned fish in the genus Enteromius from the catchments of the Longo and Cunene Rivers in Namibia and Angola.

Footnotes 

 

Enteromius
Cyprinid fish of Africa
Taxa named by Ethelwynn Trewavas
Fish described in 1936